Ķīpsala is an island on the left bank of the Daugava river,  connected to Riga city center and Pārdaugava by the Shroud Bridge. Ķīpsala is divided from the rest of Riga by the Daugava in the east, Roņu dīķis in the north, Zunda in the west and Agenskalna līcis in the south.

Buildings 

In recent years Ķīpsala has become a prestigious area for living in Riga. There is a campus of the Riga Technical University including dormitories on Ķīpsala as well as the Olimpia shopping mall. The International School of Riga campus has also been located on Ķīpsala since 2001, but has moved in 2018.

The Žanis Lipke Memorial is located on the island at Mazais Balasta dambis 9. It was built next to the home of Jānis Lipke, where he had arranged a shelter for rescued Jews during the Nazi occupation.

Neighbourhoods in Riga
Islands in Riga